Mark Jules (born 5 September 1971) is an English former footballer who played as a left-back or winger.

External links

Profile at Neil Brown's site

1971 births
Living people
Footballers from Bradford
English footballers
Association football midfielders
Bradford City A.F.C. players
Scarborough F.C. players
Chesterfield F.C. players
Halifax Town A.F.C. players
Alfreton Town F.C. players